Michael Fucito (born March 29, 1986) is a retired American soccer player.

Career

High School and College
Fucito played for the Brooks School in North Andover, Massachusetts for three years where he was senior Captain. He played forward/striker alongside Charlie Davies, making the striking duo one of (if not) the most lethal HS scoring combination(s) in the country. He also wrestled and played hockey.  In 2003, he led Brooks to the first undefeated/untied season in (ISL) league history, and to winning the New England Prep 'A' Championship. He was also voted All-New England, All-State, and All-League. He was the league leader in assists, third overall in points scoring, and was the ISL coaches' runner-up to Davies for MVP. From 2002–2004, he also played for FC Greater Boston Bolts, who were the U-18 Region 1 Champions in 2004. Fucito was MVP of the 2003 MA State Finals. The Bolts also won: the Region 1 Premier League Championship (2003), Disney Showcase Championship (2002, 2003), and MA State Championship (2000–04).

Fucito attended the Ivy League university Harvard where he played varsity soccer for four years. In 2004, he was named Ivy League Rookie of the Year, scoring three goals and tallying three assists, and was named to the All-Ivy second team as a freshman. Fucito did not play in 2005, instead playing the eventual Acton Indoor Soccer Champion, Mean Machine. He had tremendous success at Harvard from 2006 to 2008 playing both left wing and forward. He was named NSCAA All-America second team in 2007 and 2008 (both as a forward); All-Northeast Region first team and All-Ivy League first team in 2006–2008, as well as the team MVP in 2006. That year he scored nine goals and ranked among the nation’s leaders with a total of nine assists, playing left wing. Fucito was also honored as SoccerTimes’ National Player of the Week as a result of scoring the game-winning goal against Fairfield in double overtime, and two goals and three assists against Brown. He led Harvard to the NCAA-tournament three consecutive years. In 2007 and 2008, he was named Academic All-Ivy League. He was also named to the ESPN Academic All-District team in 2007. He completed his Harvard career ranked 4th All-time in scoring with 32 career goals, and 24 assists, despite playing injured his final two seasons, and undergoing hip surgery in the off-season. He was named Captain as a senior, and was a Finalist for the Lowe’s Senior CLASS Award. He ranked 21st in the nation averaging 1.57 points per game.

Professional
 Fucito was drafted in the fourth round (46th overall) of the 2009 MLS SuperDraft by Seattle Sounders FC. He attended part of the Sounders preseason, including traveling with the team to Argentina in March 2009. He returned to Harvard to finish his degree, before rejoining the Sounders on July 3, 2009, when he signed a developmental contract.

Despite returning quickly to full health, Fucito was not activated for the remainder of the 2009 MLS season after being diagnosed with sesamoiditis in his right foot. He was briefly waived on November 25, 2009, before he could make his professional debut. Nonetheless, Fucito was invited back to camp and was then re-signed prior to the 2010 season. He accompanied the team to Spain, and scored three goals in preseason, including two in the first half against the Sounders starters in the final contest. As a result, he was finally rewarded by being designated to the "dress-18", and subsequently made his professional debut on March 25, 2010, in the opening game of the 2010 MLS season against Philadelphia Union.

On April 17, 2010, Fucito scored his first MLS goal, a game-winning strike in stoppage time off a throw-in by Brad Evans during a match between Sounders FC and the then Kansas City Wizards. Fucito finished strong with his right foot over the left shoulder of Jimmy Nielsen.

Fucito earned his first professional start on September 22, 2010 versus Monterrey in the CONCACAF Champions League group stage. He scored a goal and forced an own-goal in that match.  His first start in league play came on May 25, 2011 versus FC Dallas.  Fucito became a particular fan favorite for his intensity and "never-say-die" attitude.

Fucito was traded to Montreal Impact on February 18, 2012 along with teammate Lamar Neagle, in exchange for Eddie Johnson.

Fucito failed to settle in Montreal, and was traded to Portland Timbers on April 20, 2012 in exchange for an international roster spot.

On January 17, 2013, Fucito was traded to San Jose Earthquakes for a second-round 2013 MLS SuperDraft pick.

Statistics

Honors
Seattle Sounders FC
 Lamar Hunt U.S. Open Cup: 2011

References

External links
 MLS player profile

1986 births
Living people
People from Concord, Massachusetts
Sportspeople from Middlesex County, Massachusetts
American soccer players
American expatriate soccer players
Harvard Crimson men's soccer players
Harvard University alumni
Seattle Sounders FC players
CF Montréal players
Portland Timbers players
San Jose Earthquakes players
Sacramento Republic FC players
Soccer players from Massachusetts
Expatriate soccer players in Canada
Seattle Sounders FC draft picks
Major League Soccer players
USL Championship players
Brooks School alumni
Association football forwards